The 2013–14 Butler Bulldogs women's basketball team represented Butler University in the 2013–14 NCAA Division I women's basketball season. Their head coach was Beth Couture, serving her 12th year. The Bulldogs played their home games at the Hinkle Fieldhouse, which has a capacity of approximately 10,000. This is Butler's first season competing in the Big East.

Roster

Source:  2013-14 Butler Women's Basketball Roster

Schedule

|-
!colspan=9 style="background:#13294B; color:#FFFFFF;"| Exhibition

|-
!colspan=9 style="background:#13294B; color:#FFFFFF;"| Non-Conference Regular Season

|-
!colspan=9 style="background:#13294B; color:#FFFFFF;"| Big East Conference Play

|-
!colspan=9 style="background:#13294B; color:#FFFFFF;"| Big East Tournament

|-
!colspan=12 style="background:#13294B; color:#FFFFFF;"| WNIT

Source:  Butler Bulldogs women's basketball schedule

References

Butler
Butler Bulldogs women's basketball seasons
Butler Bulldogs women's basketball
Butler Bulldogs women's basketball
2014 Women's National Invitation Tournament participants